Parliamentary elections were held in Gazankulu on 25 January 1989.

Electoral system
The Legislative Assembly had a total of 86 members, of which half were elected and half appointed.

References

Gazankulu
Elections in South African bantustans
Gazankulu
January 1989 events in Africa